Courtney Davies (born 1 July 1994) is a Welsh professional rugby league footballer who plays as a  or .

Background
Davies was born in Port Talbot, Wales.

Career
Davies is a Welsh international. In 2015, he made his international début in the opening European Cup game against Scotland.
He now works for Openreach in south wales. top shagga. He was once described as a “hero” to top fan James Northcott.

References

External links
(archived by web.archive.org) South Wales Ironmen profile
(archived by web.archive.org) Statistics at rlwc2017.com

1994 births
Living people
Gloucestershire All Golds players
London Skolars players
Rugby league five-eighths
Rugby league halfbacks
Rugby league players from Port Talbot
South Wales Scorpions players
Wales national rugby league team players
Welsh rugby league players